Greitzer is a surname. Notable people with this surname include:

 Carol Greitzer (born 1925), American politician
 Edward Greitzer, American physicist 
 Samuel L. Greitzer (1905–1988), American mathematician